Thomas Hyndeman DD (a.k.a. Hendeman or Hendyman) was an English medieval churchman, college head, and university chancellor.

Hyndeman was a Fellow of Exeter College, Oxford and was Rector of the college from 16 October 1389 until 2 April 1390. He became Dean of Crantock in Cornwall on 8 December 1390. Hyndeman achieved the degree of Doctor of Divinity. He was twice Chancellor of the University of Oxford during  1394–1395 and 1399–1400.

References

Year of birth unknown
Year of death unknown
14th-century English Roman Catholic priests
Fellows of Exeter College, Oxford
Rectors of Exeter College, Oxford
Chancellors of the University of Oxford